The Qi'ao Bridge is a cable stayed bridge located in Zhuhai, Guangdong Province, China. Opened in 1998, the bridge spans  over the Pearl River to Qi'ao Island.

External links

Bridges in Guangdong
Suspension bridges in China
Bridges completed in 1998
Zhuhai